The list should also contain various important Czech topics that are not yet covered.

The list is divided into categories, ordered alphabetically (initially inspired by List of United Kingdom-related topics). Make new categories, rename or update them.  Place the entries that don't fit or deserve its own category into the 'Miscellaneous' at the bottom of the list.

The main page
 Czech Republic

Symbols 
 Flag of the Czech Republic
 Coat of arms of the Czech Republic
 Kde domov můj (the anthem)
 National symbols of the Czech Republic
 Crown of Saint Wenceslas

Culture of the Czech Republic
 Music of the Czech Republic
 Czech Philharmonic
 Prague Spring International Music Festival
 Composers
 Antonín Dvořák, Bedřich Smetana, Gustav Mahler, Leoš Janáček, Bohuslav Martinů
 Works
 The Bartered Bride, Symphony No. 9 (Dvořák), Rusalka (opera), Má vlast
 Museums in the Czech Republic
National Museum
 Cinema of the Czech Republic
 Czechoslovak new wave
 Karlovy Vary International Film Festival
 Barrandov Studios
 Filmmakers
 Miloš Forman, Věra Chytilová, Jiří Menzel, Jan Švankmajer, Jiří Trnka, Zdeněk Miler, Karel Zeman
 Works
 Closely Watched Trains
 Literature of the Czech Republic
 Writers
 German speaking: Franz Kafka, Rainer Maria Rilke, Max Brod, Karl Kraus, Franz Werfel
 Czech speaking: Jaroslav Seifert, Milan Kundera, Karel Čapek, Jaroslav Hašek, Bohumil Hrabal, Jan Neruda
 Works
 Codex Gigas, The Trial, The Good Soldier Švejk, The Unbearable Lightness of Being
 Institutions
 National Library of the Czech Republic
 Franz Kafka Prize
 Theatre of the Czech Republic
 National Theatre
 R.U.R.
 Art of the Czech Republic
 Alphonse Mucha
 Venus of Dolní Věstonice
 National Gallery in Prague
 Video gaming in the Czech Republic
 Mafia (video game)
 Popular culture
 Mole (Zdeněk Miler character)
 Pat a Mat
 Jára Cimrman
 Spejbl and Hurvínek
 Pan Tau
 Arabela (TV series)
 Návštěvníci (TV series)
 Tři oříšky pro Popelku
 Karel Gott
 Mythology
 Libuše
 Přemysl the Ploughman
 Lech, Czech, and Rus
 Golem

Economy of the Czech Republic
 Czech koruna
 Czechoslovak koruna
 Prague groschen
 Czech National Bank
 Communications in the Czech Republic
 Škoda Auto
 Avast
 Temelín Nuclear Power Station
 Dukovany Nuclear Power Station

Education
 Education in the Czech Republic
 List of schools in the Czech Republic
 List of universities in the Czech Republic
 Charles University
 Masaryk University
 Czech Technical University in Prague
 Prague Conservatory

Environment
 rivers:
 Elbe, Vltava
 nature reserves:
 Šumava National Park
 Krkonoše National Park
 Podyjí National Park
 Bohemian Switzerland
 others
 Campanula gelida
 Prague Zoo

Built environment
 Urban Planning in the Czech Republic

Food
 Dumplings
 Beer in the Czech Republic
 Pilsner
 Pilsner Urquell
 Becherovka

Geography of the Czech Republic
 Bohemia
 Moravia
 Czech Silesia 
 Czech lands
 Regions of the Czech Republic
 List of cities in the Czech Republic
 List of dams and reservoirs in Czech Republic
 List of lakes in the Czech Republic
 List of ponds in the Czech Republic

Geology of the Czech Republic

History of the Czech Republic
 List of rulers of Bohemia
 Medieval
 Boii, Marcomanni, Samo's Empire, Great Moravia, Old Church Slavonic, Glagolitic script, Přemyslid dynasty, Duchy of Bohemia, Kingdom of Bohemia, Battle on the Marchfeld, Charles IV, Hussites, Hussite Wars, Battle of Mohács
 Modern Times
 Bohemian Revolt, Battle of White Mountain, Battle of Kolín, Battle of Austerlitz, Battle of Königgrätz, Battle of Domstadtl, Czech National Revival, Austro-Slavism
 20th century and on
 Czechoslovakia, History of Czechoslovakia, Czechoslovak Legion, First Czechoslovak Republic, Tomáš Garrigue Masaryk, Little Entente, Sudetenland, Munich Agreement, Second Czechoslovak Republic, German occupation of Czechoslovakia, Protectorate of Bohemia and Moravia, Czechoslovak government-in-exile, Operation Anthropoid, Beneš decrees, 1948 Czechoslovak coup d'état, Prague Spring, Warsaw Pact invasion of Czechoslovakia, Charter 77, Velvet revolution, Hyphen War, Dissolution of Czechoslovakia

Languages in the Czech Republic
 Czech language
 Czech alphabet, hacek

Law and Policing
 Czech nationality law
 Judiciary of the Czech Republic
 Legal system of the Czech Republic
 Constitution of the Czech Republic
 Capital punishment in the Czech Republic
 Human rights in the Czech Republic
 LGBT rights in the Czech Republic

Media, newspapers, etc.
 List of Czech language television channels
 Czech TV
 TV Nova
 Radio 1

Military of the Czech Republic
 Army of the Czech Republic
 Jan Žižka
 Albrecht von Wallenstein
 Joseph Radetzky von Radetz
 Ludvík Svoboda

Monuments
 List of World Heritage sites in the Czech Republic
 Czech Gothic architecture
 Czech Renaissance architecture
 Czech Baroque architecture
 Prague Castle
 St. Vitus Cathedral
 Charles Bridge
 Dancing House
 Prague astronomical clock
 Karlštejn
 Villa Tugendhat
 Pilgrimage Church of Saint John of Nepomuk
 Sedlec Ossuary
 Holy Trinity Column in Olomouc
 Vyšehrad
 Wenceslas Square
 Kroměříž Castle
 Church of Our Lady before Týn
 Konopiště
 Old New Synagogue
 Old Town Square
 Špilberk Castle
 Golden Lane
 Lednice–Valtice Cultural Landscape
 Powder Tower, Prague
 Žižkov Television Tower
 Rudolfinum
 St. Barbara's Church, Kutná Hora
 Český Krumlov
 St. Procopius Basilica in Třebíč
 Bethlehem Chapel
 Hluboká Castle
 Municipal House
 Litomyšl Castle
 Adolf Loos

People in the Czech Republic
 Demographics of the Czech Republic
 Czechs
 List of Czechs
 Youth in the Czech Republic

Politics of the Czech Republic
 List of presidents of the Czech Republic
 Václav Havel, Václav Klaus, Miloš Zeman
 List of prime ministers of the Czech Republic
 List of political parties in the Czech Republic
 ODS, ČSSD, ANO 2011
 Foreign relations of the Czech Republic
 Visegrád Group
 Security Information Service, intelligence agency
 Parliament of the Czech Republic
 President of the Czech Republic
 Prime Minister of the Czech Republic
 Order of the White Lion
 Order of Tomáš Garrigue Masaryk
 Bertha von Suttner
 Jan Palach

Religion
 Religion in the Czech Republic
 Religion in Communist Czechoslovakia
 Baptist Union in the Czech Republic, Hussites, Utraquism, Unity of the Brethren (Czech Republic), Unity of the Brethren Baptists, Moravian Church, Knights of the Cross with the Red Star
 Infant Jesus of Prague

Science and technology
 Czech Academy of Sciences
 Prague linguistic circle
 Semtex
 7796 Járacimrman
 30564 Olomouc
 Bohemian Society of Sciences
 Otto's encyclopedia
 Czech Wikipedia
 Scientists
 German speaking: Sigmund Freud, Gregor Mendel, Kurt Gödel, Peter Grünberg, Ernst Mach, Gerty Cori, Carl Cori, Ferdinand Porsche, Edmund Husserl, Joseph Schumpeter 
 Czech speaking: Jan Hus, Jan Amos Komenský, Jaroslav Heyrovský, Jan Evangelista Purkyně, František Palacký, Bedřich Hrozný, Vladimír Remek

Sport 
 Sport in the Czech Republic
 Czech Olympic Committee
 Czech Republic at the Olympics
 Czechoslovakia at the Olympics
 Bohemia at the Olympics
 Czech Republic national football team
 Czech Republic Davis Cup team
 Czech Republic Fed Cup team
 Czech Republic men's national ice hockey team
 Czech Republic men's national volleyball team
 Czechoslovakia national football team
 Czechoslovakia men's national ice hockey team
 Czechoslovakia national basketball team
 AC Sparta Prague
 SK Slavia Prague
 Czech First League
 Football Association of the Czech Republic
 Sokol
 Czech Republic motorcycle Grand Prix
 Golden Spike Ostrava
 O2 Arena (Prague)
 Athletes
 Martina Navratilova, Ivan Lendl, Petra Kvitová, Jana Novotná, Jan Kodeš, Hana Mandlíková, Petr Korda, Josef Masopust, Petr Čech, Pavel Nedvěd, Emil Zátopek, Jan Železný, Barbora Špotáková, Jarmila Kratochvílová, Věra Čáslavská, Jaromír Jágr, Dominik Hašek, Kateřina Neumannová, Ester Ledecká, Martina Sáblíková

Transportation in the Czech Republic
 List of Czech cars, Czech Airlines, Czechoslovak Sea Shipping, Prague Metro, Ruzyně International Airport, Tatra (car), České dráhy

Miscellaneous
 Chemical Workers' Union (Czechoslovakia)
 Tourism in the Czech Republic
 :Category:Companies of the Czech Republic

See also
 Lists of country-related topics – topics related to other countries
 Outline of Prague